Minlei Road is a station on Line 9 of the Shanghai Metro. It began passenger trial operation with the rest of phase 3 of Line 9, an easterly extension with 9 new stations, on December 30, 2017.

References 

Railway stations in Shanghai
Shanghai Metro stations in Pudong
Railway stations in China opened in 2017
Line 9, Shanghai Metro